Sven Tony Eng (born 19 June 1959) is a Swedish curler.

He is a 1982 Swedish men's champion.

Teams

References

External links
 

Living people
1959 births
Swedish male curlers
Swedish curling champions